The 2019 Richmond Kickers season was the club's 27th season of existence, their 15th season in the third tier of American soccer, and their first season in the newly-created USL League One. It was the Kickers' first season playing in the third tier of American soccer since 2016, when they were in the United Soccer League. The season covers the period from October 14, 2018 to the beginning of the 2020 USL League One season.

Roster

Non-competitive

Preseason
On January 19, 2019, the Kickers revealed their preseason schedule. Richmond played seven matches in the span of just over a month, including five games against collegiate programs and two games against clubs from the USL Championship. All six games took place in the state of Virginia, with the Kickers playing host to five of those games; just one, however, was played at City Stadium.

Midseason

Competitive

USL League One

Standings

Results by round

Match results
On December 7, 2018, the league announced the home openers for its inaugural season. Richmond's first-ever match in the league will take place on March 30, 2019, with the Kickers playing host to Lansing Ignite. Richmond will also take part in the home-opening match for Lansing, visiting Cooley Law School Stadium on April 13.

The remainder of the league schedule was released on December 10, 2018. The inaugural USL League One season will consist of 28 matches for the Kickers, with Richmond playing four times against Chattanooga Red Wolves and three times against every other opponent. Richmond will renew their series with Orlando City B and Toronto FC II, both of whom they previously faced in the United Soccer League; they will face all seven other teams for the first time.

U.S. Open Cup

As a member of USL League One, the Kickers entered the tournament in the First Round, playing on May 7, 2019.

Statistics

Appearances and goals

|-
|colspan=10 align=center|Players who left Richmond during the season:

|}

Disciplinary record

Clean sheets

Transfers

In

Loan in

Out

Awards

USL1 All-League Teams

USL1 Team of the Week

USL1 Player of the Week

USL1 Goal of the Week

USL1 Save of the Week

Kits

See also
 Richmond Kickers
 2019 in American soccer
 2019 USL League One season

References

Richmond Kickers seasons
Richmond Kickers
Richmond Kickers
Richmond Kickers